The Medical Research Council (UK) Human Genetics Unit is situated at the Western General Hospital in Edinburgh. It is one of the largest MRC research establishments, housing over two hundred scientists, support staff, research fellows, PhD students, and visiting workers.

Staff
 current and former staff at the MRC HGU include:

Directors
 1956–1969 Dr Michael Court Brown
 1969–1994 Professor John Evans
 1994–2015 Professor Nicholas Hastie
 2015–     Professor Wendy Bickmore

Group leaders
 Pleasantine Mill
 Chris Ponting

Sections
The Human Genetics Unit is divided into three sections:

Biomedical Genomics
-Research harnesses the power of large genome-size and population data to reveal the complex nature of disease processes.
Section Head: Professor Chris Ponting

Genome Regulation
-Research focuses on mechanisms that maintain the stability of the genome between cells and between generations, regulate the expression of genes and how changes to these contribute to disease.
Section Head: Professor Javier Caceres

Disease Mechanisms
-Research aims to understand how changes in our genomes cause disease by studying patients and families as well as model organisms.
Joint Section Heads: Professor David FitzPatrick and Professor Ian Jackson

Institute of Genetics and Molecular Medicine (IGMM)
In 2007 the Human Genetics Unit formed a partnership with two neighbouring research centres on the Western General Hospital campus, the Centre for Genomic and Experimental Medicine (University of Edinburgh) and the Edinburgh Cancer Research Centre (Cancer Research UK), to create the Institute of Genetics and Molecular Medicine. The Human Genetics Unit officially became part of the University of Edinburgh in 2011. The three partner centres comprising the Institute of Genetics and Molecular Medicine were linked with a new building in 2015.

References

External links
Medical Research Council (UK)
MRC Human Genetics Unit
Institute of Genetics and Molecular Medicine
Centre for Genomic and Experimental Medicine
Edinburgh Cancer Research Centre
Western General Hospital

Genetics in the United Kingdom
Genetics or genomics research institutions
Human genetics
Medical Research Council (United Kingdom)
Medical research institutes in the United Kingdom
Research institutes established in 1967
Research institutes in Edinburgh